The Wallis Annenberg Wildlife Crossing is a vegetated overpass spanning the Ventura Freeway and Agoura Road under construction at Liberty Canyon in Agoura Hills, California. The bridge will be one of the largest urban wildlife crossings in the United States, connecting the Simi Hills and the Santa Monica Mountains over a busy freeway with ten traffic lanes, when including exit lanes.

Background 
The bridge is a creative way to allow animals to circulate through and thrive in areas that are fragmented and most affected by humans. The crossing is particularly critical for the mountain lion population indigenous to the Santa Monica Mountains, which has declined due to the Ventura Freeway acting as a barrier in the wildlife corridor between the Simi Hills to the north and the Santa Monica Mountains to the south. This has caused the Santa Monica Mountains mountain lion population to become genetically isolated.

The National Park Service has recorded a dozen mountain lions struck and killed by motorists on the section of freeway paralleling the Santa Monica Mountains since 2002 when they began a study. In 2013, a mountain lion, traveling from the north and on the verge of bringing new genetic material, died trying to cross at this location. Most mountain lions approach this particular area and turn back without attempting the hazardous crossing of the freeway as shown by GPS tracking collars fitted to them by the researchers.

In 2020, wildlife biologists found the first evidence of physical abnormalities in the isolated population. Newcomers would bring new genetic material into the mountains where the lack of genetic diversity is a serious threat to their long-term survival. It would allow young mountain lions born in the Santa Monica Mountains the chance to find new territory before possibly being killed by one of the dominant older males.

This will be the first bridge on the California highway system designed specifically for fostering wildlife connectivity. Other wildlife such as bobcats, coyote, deer, and fence lizards will also be able to take advantage of the bridge. The Ventura Freeway is a heavily travelled commuter route serving the Greater Los Angeles area and connecting Los Angeles and Ventura Counties with about 300,000 cars a day. Scientists identified Liberty Canyon as the best location for a wildlife crossing because it was one of the few areas with the lands on both sides of the freeway that are publicly owned and protected. The crossing is situated along a wildlife corridor within the Santa Monica Mountains National Recreation Area that consists of thousands of acres of local, state and federal protected lands and stretches northerly from Los Angeles into Ventura County. The county of Ventura has adopted a wildlife corridor protection ordinance that restricts activities that will impede the movement of mountains lions and other wildlife between the Santa Monica Mountains and the Los Padres National Forest.

Design 
To encourage use by wildlife, the bridge will have lush but drought-tolerant vegetation with matte materials to deflect bright headlights and insulation to quiet the roar of cars. Fencing at each end will help funnel them onto the crossing. A second phase of the project will cross a frontage road that is parallel with the freeway. Landscaping of the nearly  includes  of habitat restoration in the area. The restoration is partially needed because the 2018 Woolsey Fire burned through the wildlife corridor as it was pushed by strong Santa Ana winds in a southerly direction and crossed the freeway in this area.

The draft environmental document was released in 2017. A tunnel was considered as an alternative but it would be less able to attract usage by wildlife and wouldn’t sustain vegetation. The California Department of Transportation, Caltrans, will oversee design and construction as it crosses a major transportation route.

Funding campaign 
In 2014, the National Wildlife Federation and the Santa Monica Mountains Fund joined forces with the #SaveLACougars campaign to raise money for the project. P-22 was the inspiration for the funding drive and became the poster puma for the promotion. P-22 was a mountain lion that survived crossing two freeways, the 101 and the 405, to reach Griffith Park at the easterly end of the Santa Monica Mountains and became a celebrity. In 2014, the California Wildlife Conservation Board gave a $650,000 grant to the Resource Conservation District of the Santa Monica Mountains for the design of the crossing. In 2015, the California Coastal Commission gave a $1 million grant to Caltrans for environmental assessment. Private donors were encouraged to contribute. The project stalled for years due to lack of funding. In May 2021, the Annenberg Foundation offered a $25M challenge grant for the project, with $35M needed to unlock the grant. As of mid-April 2022, donations totaled more than $87 million with more than 5,000 individuals, foundations, agencies and businesses contributing expertise and donations. The project costs around $90 million, with funding from private donations covering about 60% and the rest coming from public funds set aside for conservation purposes.

Construction 

A groundbreaking ceremony was held on Earth Day in April 2022 with Governor Gavin Newsom, Wallis Annenberg, wildlife biologists and members of the public along with local, state and federal legislators. Caltrans set the beginning of construction for spring 2022 with construction to be completed within two years. Initial work included relocation of public utilities.

References

External links 
 Wallis Annenberg Wildlife Crossing, Annenberg Foundation
 US-101 – Wallis Annenberg Wildlife Crossing at Liberty Canyon, Caltrans
 Wildlife Crossing at Liberty Canyon, Resource Conservation District of the Santa Monica Mountains
 Liberty Canyon Wildlife Crossing, Santa Monica Mountains Conservancy
 Liberty Canyon Wildlife Crossing, Save Open Space, Santa Monica Mountains
 Liberty Wildlife Corridor Partnership (savelacougars.org)
 The building of the world’s largest animal crossing, Michelle Loxton, KCLU, April 1, 2022 (podcast)

Proposed bridges in the United States
2022 establishments in California
Simi Hills
Natural history of the Santa Monica Mountains
Natural history of Los Angeles County, California
Agoura Hills, California
Santa Monica Mountains National Recreation Area
Wildlife conservation